A knowledge engine generally refers to a tool for automatically extracting and structuring knowledge from unstructured sources, often with a way to search it. 

Knowledge engine or Knowledge Engine may also refer to:

 WolframAlpha, a website and service often described as a computational knowledge engine or answer engine 
 Knowledge Engine (search engine), a former search engine concept developed by the Wikimedia Foundation
 The mind itself is sometimes referred to as a knowledge engine

See also
 Knowledge graph, graph-based datastores, often used to by search engines to enhance search results with semantic interconnections
 Knowledge organization, a field of study related to library and information science
 Semantic networks